Asher Tyler (May 10, 1798 – August 1, 1875) was a United States representative from New York. Born in Bridgewater, Oneida County, he was graduated from Hamilton College in 1817, studied law, was admitted to the bar and commenced practice in Ellicottville, Cattaraugus County in 1836. He was an agent of the Devereaux Land Co., with headquarters at Ellicottville, and subsequently served in a like capacity for the Erie Co. He held several local offices and was elected as a Whig to the Twenty-eighth Congress, holding office from March 4, 1843, to March 3, 1845. He moved to Elmira in 1846 and engaged in railroad operations. Tyler was one of the incorporators of the Elmira Rolling Mill Co., and in 1875 died in Elmira. Interment was in Woodlawn Cemetery.

References

1798 births
1875 deaths
People from Oneida County, New York
Hamilton College (New York) alumni
Whig Party members of the United States House of Representatives from New York (state)
19th-century American politicians